, is a Japanese actor and voice actor. He is known for his roles in the Kerberos saga, as Inui (StrayDog: Kerberos Panzer Cops), Kazuki Fuse (Jin-Roh), and Chuichi Koshiramaru (Tachiguishi-Retsuden), along with his unusual stature of 190 cm and 86 kg. Fujiki was featured in Mamoru Oshii's 2009 live-action film Assault Girls.

References

External links 

1964 births
Japanese male voice actors
Living people
Male voice actors from Toyama Prefecture